Karl Algot Ragnar Fogelmark (15 March 1888 – 20 September 1914) was a Swedish wrestler. He competed in the light heavyweight event at the 1912 Summer Olympics. Fogelmark committed suicide in 1914.

References

External links
 

1888 births
1914 suicides
Olympic wrestlers of Sweden
Wrestlers at the 1912 Summer Olympics
Swedish male sport wrestlers
Sportspeople from Gotland County
Suicides in Sweden